The 2017–18 Texas–Arlington Mavericks women's basketball team represents the University of Texas at Arlington in the 2017–18 NCAA Division I women's basketball season. The Mavericks, led by fifth year head coach Krista Gerlich, play their home games at the College Park Center and were members of the Sun Belt Conference. They finished the season 18–12, 12–6 in Sun Belt play to finish in a tie for third place. They lost in the quarterfinals of the Sun Belt women's tournament to Louisiana.

Previous season
They finished the season 22–9, 14–4 in Sun Belt play to finish in second place. They advanced to the semifinals of the Sun Belt women's tournament where they lost to Troy. They were invited to the WNIT where they lost to Tulane in the first round.

Roster

Schedule

|-
!colspan=9 style=| Non-conference regular season

|-
!colspan=9 style=| Sun Belt regular season

|-
!colspan=9 style=| Sun Belt Women's Tournament

Rankings
2017–18 NCAA Division I women's basketball rankings

See also
 2017–18 Texas–Arlington Mavericks men's basketball team

References

Texas-Arlington
UT Arlington Mavericks women's basketball seasons